Barbara Honigmann (born 12 February 1949 in East Berlin) is a German author, artist and theater director.

Honigmann is the daughter of Jewish emigrant parents, who returned to East Berlin in 1947 after a period of exile in Great Britain. Her parents were Litzi Friedmann (1910–1991;  Alice Kohlmann), an Austrian Communist who was the first wife of Kim Philby, a member of the Cambridge Five, and Georg Honigmann, PhD (1903–1984). Her mother was born in Vienna, Austria-Hungary, and worked in film dubbing in her later years. Her father was born in Wiesbaden, Germany and was the chief editor of the Berliner Zeitung while also being a filmmaker. The couple divorced in 1954.

From 1967 to 1972, Barbara Honigmann studied theater at Humboldt University in East Berlin. In the following years she worked as a dramatist and director in Brandenburg and Berlin. She has been a freelance writer since 1975. In 1981, she married Peter Obermann who later took her surname; the two went on to have two children together, Johannes (b. 1976) and Ruben (b. 1983). In 1984, she and Peter left the GDR to move to a German Jewish community in Strasbourg, France. Honigmann began finally to explore her German roots in the end of the 20th century 

According to Emily Jeremiah from The Institute of Modern Languages Research, "Honigmann’s texts are also paradigmatic of post-exile writings by German-Jewish authors. In addition, they offer examples of literary reactions to the demise of the GDR by its decamped intellectuals, and represent the articulations of a new generation of women writers"

Life in the theater 
Honigmann worked for many years in theater as a playwright and dramatist. In addition to working in Brandenburg, she also worked in the Deutsches Theater in Berlin. Some of the plays she wrote were later changed into radio plays. 

Both of her plays and radio plays have elements of fairy tales or historical lives weaved into them. One of Honigmann's radio plays was awarded with "radio play of the month" by the South German Radio Station.

Awards 

 1986 – Aspekte-Literaturpreis
 1992 – 
 1994 – 
 1996 – Ehrengabe der Deutschen Schillerstiftung
 2000 – Kleist Prize
 2001 – Jeanette-Schocken-Preis
 2004 – Solothurner Literaturpreis
 2004 – Koret Jewish Book Award
 2011 – Max Frisch Prize

Works 

 Das singende, springende Löweneckerchen, Berlin 1979
 Der Schneider von Ulm, Berlin 1981
 Don Juan, Berlin 1981
 Roman von einem Kinde, Darmstadt [u.a.] 1986 
 Eine Liebe aus nichts, Reinbek: Rowohlt 1991 
 Soharas Reise, Berlin 1996 
 Am Sonntag spielt der Rabbi Fußball, Heidelberg: Wunderhorn 1998 
 Damals, dann und danach, München: Hanser 1999  
 Alles, alles Liebe!, Munich: dtv 2000 
 Ein Kapitel aus meinem Leben, Munich: Hanser 2004 
 Das Gesicht wiederfinden. Über Schreiben, Schriftsteller und Judentum, Munich: Hanser 2006  & 
 Blick übers Tal. Zu Fotos von Arnold Zwahlen Basel/Weil am Rhein: Engeler 2007, 
 Das überirdische Licht: Rückkehr nach New York, Munich: Hanser 2008   & 
 Bilder von A., Munich: Hanser 2011  & 
 Chronik meiner Straße, Munich: Hanser 2015  &

Translations 
 Lev Ustinov: Die Holz-Eisenbahn, Berlin 1979 (with Nelly Drechsler)
 Anna Akhmatova: Vor den Fenstern Frost, Berlin 1988 (with Fritz Mierau)

References

Barbara Honigmann in Jewish Women's Archive

External links 
Barbara Honigmann on artnet

1949 births
Living people
People from East Berlin
20th-century German novelists
21st-century German novelists
20th-century German Jews
German women dramatists and playwrights
East German writers
East German women
Writers from Berlin
Jewish women writers
German women novelists
Kleist Prize winners
21st-century German women writers
20th-century German women writers
21st-century German dramatists and playwrights
20th-century German dramatists and playwrights